Tracking Down Maggie is a 1994 documentary film by Nick Broomfield about former British prime minister Margaret Thatcher. What begins as a genuine attempt to get an interview with the so-called 'Iron Lady' quickly turns into a game of cat-and-mouse in the United States, with the filmmaker snubbed at every turn.

Aside from the comedy of Broomfield's repeatedly failing attempts to gain access, the film discusses the accusations that Thatcher's son, Mark, used his mother's connections to effect arms deals in Saudi Arabia.

External links
 
 Official website
 
 Tracking Down Maggie Review

1994 films
Films directed by Nick Broomfield
Documentary films about British politicians
Films about Margaret Thatcher
Documentary films about women
1990s British films